Rajabad (also Romanized as Rajābād; also known as Deh Kaleh) is a village in Gerit Rural District, Papi District, Khorramabad County, Lorestan Province, Iran. At the 2006 census, its population was 22, in 4 families.

References 

Towns and villages in Khorramabad County